The Fender TC 90 is a semi-hollow electric guitar.

Features 
The Fender TC-90 electric guitar features a set neck with double-cut body, American-made Seymour Duncan pickups. The semi-hollow ash body is set into a maple neck with rosewood fingerboard, 22 medium-jumbo frets and abalone dots, Adjusto-Matic bridge with anchored tailpiece. The guitar's pickup complement consists of a Seymour Duncan SP90-1NRWRP vintage P-90 (neck) and SP-90 3B Custom P90 (bridge), 3-way switching with master tone and volume controls.

Production history 
The Fender TC-90 was produced in Vintage White (from 04/2004 – 10/2007) and Black Cherry Burst (from 05/2004 – 09/2007), with around 700 made of each color. In 2007 the TC-90 was revised and became the JA-90, the signature model for Jim Adkins, the singer/guitarist of Jimmy Eat World.

Fender Telecasters